Mandir (The Temple) is a 1937 Indian Hindi devotional film directed by A. R. Kardar.
Produced for the Shankar Talkies Corporation, it had music by Professor Ramzan Khan. The lyricist was Manjhar Hashiri.

The cast included Rajkumari, Dhiraj Bhattacharya, Anees Khatoon, Agha and Akhtar Nawaz.

Cast
 Dhiraj Bhattacharya
 Mahmood Shah
 Rajkumari
 Anees Khatoon
 Akhtar Nawaz
 Agha
 A. R. Pahelwan
 R. P. Kapoor

Soundtrack
The music director was Professor Ramzan Khan and the lyrics were written by Manjjar Hashiri.

Song List

References

External links
 

1937 films
1930s Hindi-language films
Films directed by A. R. Kardar
Indian black-and-white films